Anna Maria Friman-Henriksen (born August 1972) is a Swedish singer, known as one of the members of Trio Mediaeval.

Friman studied at the Barratt Due Institute of Music in Oslo and Trinity College of Music in London, then gained a doctorate (PhD) on modern performance of mediaeval music from the University of York.

Friman has collaborated with, among others, the Gavin Bryars Ensemble, the vocal duo Red Byrd, the Ciconia Ensemble, Det Norske Solistkor, the Estonian NYYD Ensemble, the Latvian Radio Choir, Collegium Vocale Gent, Ricercar Consort and her husband, Arve Henriksen.

With Trio Mediaeval, Friman has released several albums and toured across much of the Western world.

References

External links
Biography on Trio Mediaeval web-site
Biography on Friman's web-site
Anna Maria Friman of Trio Mediaeval, podcast from BBC Radio 3 Early Music Show, 13 December 2015

1972 births
Living people
Performers of early music
Swedish expatriates in Norway
Barratt Due Institute of Music alumni
Alumni of the University of York
Place of birth missing (living people)
Alumni of Trinity College of Music
21st-century Swedish singers
21st-century Swedish women singers